Carrusel de las Américas (English title: Carousel of the Americas) is a Mexican Children's telenovela produced by Valentín Pimstein for Televisa in 1992. It is both a sequel and remake of 1989 telenovela Carrusel. Chain member of the memorial project Americas 500 years since the discovery of America. It was shown via satellite to Latin America as part of that program block.

Gabriela Rivero starred as protagonist, while Irán Eory, Ricardo Blume, Saby Kamalich and Marisol Santacruz starred as stellar performances.

Cast 

The children
Luis Guillermo Martell as Julio "Pollito" Rochild
Marisol Centeno as Agustina "Nena" Martínez
Daniel Edid Bracamontes as Jacobo Bernstein
Giuliana Rivero as Ana Lucrecia de las Casas y Palacios
Romina Prieto as Flor Alegría
Kalimba Marichal as Martín Parra
Rafael Bazán as Felipe Travieso
Francis Recinas as Ernestina Travieso
Juan Cid as Enrique Fideo
Janet Pineda as Dulce Castillo
Toshi Hazama as Murakami Hikaru
Alejandra Ley as Carola Rueda
Erik Sánchez as Jesús "Chucho" Pérez
Fernando Lavín as Reynaldo Rico
Tamara Shanath as "Sam" Niña Gringa
Valentina Garibay
Francisco Huerdo
Frangueny

The adults
Gabriela Rivero as Teacher Ximena Fernández
Ricardo Blume as Don Pedro Huamán
Saby Kamalich as Rosa de Huamán
Jacqueline Moguel as Carmen
Irán Eory as Doña Marcelina de Rochild
Alma Delfina as Teacher Lupita
Marisol Santacruz as Alejandra Palacios de de las Casas
Wolf Ruvinskis as Don Mariano
Alejandro Aragón as Federico
Rosángela Balbó as Bertha
Rafael del Villar as Gustavo Rico
Edgardo Gazcón as Félix
Elvira Monsell as Bernarda
René Muñoz as Álvaro Parra
Carlos Bonavides as Anselmo
Armando Palomo as José Zamora
Renata Flores as Mrs. Directora Martirio Solís
Mariana Garza as Consuelo
Janet Ruiz as Teacher Susana
Erika Buenfil
Socorro Bonilla
Carlos Espejel
Leticia Perdigón
Diana Golden
Raquel Pankowsky
Mauricio Islas
Gloria Izaguirre
Roberto Mateos
José María Torre
Sara Montes
Frances Ondiviela
Claudio Báez
Margarita Gralia
Aurora Molina
Ana María Aguirre
Germán Bernal
Guadalupe Bolaños
Juan Carlos Bonet
Óscar Bonfiglio
Octavio Galindo
Margarita Isabel
Gilda Méndez
Jorge Pascual Rubio
Laura Sotelo
Jorge Miyamoto
María Marcucci
Brenda María
Patricia Eguía
Elías Rubio
Raúl Askenazi
Juan Carlos Serrán
María Luisa Kimura
Jonathan Axel Ruiz Peña

Awards

International Broadcasters of Carrusel 
North & South American
 
 
 
 
 
 
 
 
 

Europe & Asia

References

External links

1992 telenovelas
Mexican telenovelas
1992 Mexican television series debuts
1992 Mexican television series endings
Spanish-language telenovelas
Television shows set in Mexico
Televisa telenovelas
Children's telenovelas
Sequel television series
Television series about children